Cuddesdon and Denton is a civil parish in the county of Oxfordshire, England.  Forming part of South Oxfordshire district its main settlements are Cuddesdon and Denton.

External links

Cuddesdon and Denton community website

South Oxfordshire District
Civil parishes in Oxfordshire